Dahma bint Yahya (died 1434 / 837 A.H.) was a Yemeni scholar and poet, "well-versed in syntax, Law, metaphysics, astronomy, astrology and chemistry".

Biography
She was the daughter of the scholar Yaḥyā Ibn al-Murtaḍā and the sister of Imam Al-Mahdī Aḥmad ibn Yaḥyā. After studying under her brother, she became a writer herself. She also taught at schools in Thulā. She died in 837 A.H.

Works
 Sharh al-Azhar, 4 vols.
 Sharh al-Manzuma
 al-Kufi
 Sharh Mukhtasar al-Muntaha

References

Year of birth unknown
1434 deaths
Yemeni poets
Yemeni women poets
Yemeni scholars of Islam
Women scholars of Islam